Space is the boundless three-dimensional extent in which objects and events have relative position and direction.

Space, SPACE, spacing, or The Space may also refer to:

Acronyms
 Small Press and Alternative Comics Expo, an annual comic book convention
 Society for Promotion of Alternative Computing and Employment (SPACE), located in Trivandrum, Kerala, India
 Spectroscopic All Sky Cosmic Explorer, a proposed satellite designed to measure the baryon acoustic oscillations

Arts, entertainment, and media

Film and television

Films
 Space (1965 film)
 Space, a 1997 short film starring Karyn Dwyer

TV series
 Space (2001 TV series), a 2001 BBC production
 Space (miniseries), a 1985 TV miniseries based on the Michener book
 Space: 1999, a television show
 Space: Above and Beyond, an American TV series
 "Space" (The X-Files), an episode of the TV series
 "Space", an episode of the Adult Swim television series, Off the Air
 "Space" and "Time", two mini Doctor Who episodes

TV channels
 Space (Canadian TV channel)
 Space (Latin American TV channel)
 Space TV, an Azerbaijani television channel

Games
 Space (role-playing game series), a computer role-playing game series from Edu-Ware
 Space I (1979 videogame) 
 Space II (1980 videogame)
 Space or square, a location in a board game

Literature
 Space (Michener novel), a 1982 novel by James A. Michener
 Space (Baxter novel), a 2000 novel by Stephen Baxter

Music

Groups and labels
 Space (French band), a 1970s French electronic music band
 Space (English band), a 1990s English indie rock band
 The Tremeloes, an English band who briefly used the name "Space" on some mid-1970s releases

Albums
 Space (The Arrogant Worms album), 2014
 Space (Bleach album), 1996
 Space (The Devil Wears Prada EP), 2015
 Space (George Benson album), 1978
 Space (KSI EP), 2016
 Space (Jimmy Cauty album), 1990
 Space (Modern Jazz Quartet album), 1969

Songs
 "Space", a 2020 song by Becky Hill
 "Space" (M.I.A. song), a song by M.I.A. from her 2010 album Maya
 "Space" (Prince song), a song by Prince from his 1994 album Come
 "Space" (Slavko Kalezić song), a song by Slavko Kalezić as Montenegro's entry in the Eurovision Song Contest 2017
 "Space", a 1979 song by Alessi Brothers
 "Space", a 1968 song by The Blackbirds
 "Space", a 1989 song by Candy Flip
 "Space", a 1978 song by Franck Pourcel and His Orchestra
 "Space", a 1967 guitar piece by Gábor Szabó
 "Space", an improvisational song performed by the Grateful Dead
 "Space", a 1986 song by It's Immaterial
 "Space", a 1991 song by New Model Army
 "Space", a 2007 song by Sarah Buxton
 "Space", a 2011 song by singer-songwriter Norman Bedard
 "Space", a 2003 song by Something Corporate from North
 "Space", a 2016 song by Sabrina Carpenter from Evolution
 "Space", a 2020 song by Biffy Clyro from A Celebration of Endings

Venues
 Evanston SPACE, a concert hall in the United States
 Space, a performance venue of the National Institute of Dramatic Art, Sydney, Australia
 Space (Ibiza nightclub), a nightclub in Spain
 Space (studios), an artist studio organisation in London, England
 Space Theatre (Cape Town), in South Africa
 Space Theatre, within the Adelaide Festival Centre, Australia
 The Space (theatre), an arts venue in London, England
The Space Cinema, cinema chain in Italy, now owned by Vue International

Computing, keyboard, and printing
 Address space, and various hyponyms (data, code, virtual address spaces etc.)
 Code space of a character set, the range of code points
 Cyberspace
 DSPACE, a term in computational complexity theory
 Space (punctuation), the gap between text characters (in typography)
 Space bar, part of a computer keyboard
 A telecommunications signal state: see Mark and space

XML and HTML character entities:    
  Em space 
  En space 
  Non-breaking space 
 Thin space

Other space characters available in Unicode:
 Figure space 
 Hair space
 Zero-width space

People
 Arthur Space (1908–1983), American actor
 Zack Space (born 1961), former United States Representative
 Space (gamer) (born 2000), professional Overwatch player

Science and mathematics
 Outer space, or just space, the area beyond the limit of the Earth's atmosphere
 Space (mathematics), a set with some added structure
 Space.com, a space technology website
 Aether, a hypothetical physical medium (space-filling substance) that transmits electromagnetic waves and/or gravitation
 Solution space, the set of all possible candidate solutions in an optimization problem
 Spatium or anatomic space, a space (cavity or gap) in anatomy

Society and psychology 
 Mental space, a term in cognitive science
 Personal space
 Space (architecture), one of the elements of design of architecture
 Public space
 Social space
 Urban space

See also

 
 
 Blank space (disambiguation)
 Empty space (disambiguation)
 Inner space (disambiguation)
 Spacer (disambiguation)
 Spaces (disambiguation)
 Spacing (disambiguation)
 Void (disambiguation)
 White space (disambiguation)
 Timespace (disambiguation)
 Spacetime (disambiguation)